Naupada railway station (station code:NWP), located in the Indian state of Andhra Pradesh, serves Naupada in Srikakulam district. It is a junction station with a branch line to Gunupur in Rayagada district of Odisha which was built by Maharaja of Paralakhemundi.Former it was known as Parlakimedi Light Railway.

History
The southern part of the East Coast State Railway (from Waltair to Vijayawada) was taken over by Madras Railway in 1901.

The Paralakhemedi Light Railway opened Naupada–Gunupur line in 1900. The line was converted to broad gauge in 2011.

Railway reorganization
The Bengal Nagpur Railway was nationalized in 1944. Eastern Railway was formed on 14 April 1952 with the portion of East Indian Railway Company east of Mughalsarai and the Bengal Nagpur Railway. In 1955, South Eastern Railway was carved out of Eastern Railway. It comprised lines mostly operated by BNR earlier. Amongst the new zones started in April 2003 were East Coast Railway  and South East Central Railway. Both these railways were carved out of South Eastern Railway.

Infrastructure 
Naupada Junction lies on the Palasa–Tilaru section, which was electrified in 1999–2000. Government has allotted  for the development of infrastructure in the station along with Srikakulam Road railway station.

References

Railway stations in Srikakulam district
Railway stations in Waltair railway division